The following is a list of awards and nominations received by The Practice, an American television series which ran from March 4, 1997, until May 16, 2004, and was broadcast on ABC. It was nominated for a large number of awards including 41 Primetime Emmy Awards (fifteen wins), 16 Viewers For Quality Television Q Awards (six wins), 11 NAACP Image Awards (one win), 7 Golden Globe Awards (three wins), 6 Satellite Awards (one win), 3 Screen Actors Guild Awards, a WGA Award and the series won a Peabody Award.

The series holds the Primetime Emmy Award record for most wins in the Guest Actor and Guest Actress categories for a single series, as well as most nominations in those categories, a total of nine outstanding guest actor and actress Emmys along with 7 nominations went to the show.

Camryn Manheim was the first regular actress to win an Emmy, and Michael Badalucco the first regular actor. Camryn Manheim is also the only actor to win both an Emmy and a Golden Globe for her performance. Steve Harris and Dylan McDermott both got a total of nine individual nominations, which made them the most nominated actors from The Practice

When the series ended, in 2004, it was nominated for over a hundred awards and won 41.

Emmy Awards
The series holds the Primetime Emmy Award record for most wins in the Guest Actor and Guest Actress categories for a single series. A total of forty-one nominations went to the show, of which 15 were won. Camryn Manheim was the first actress to win an Emmy (in 1998) and James Spader, eventually, the last actor.  "Happily Ever After", "Betrayal" and "The Day After" were the most nominated episodes, with all two nominations. The series won the Outstanding Drama Series Emmy twice. In both 1999 and 2000, the 52nd and the 53rd Primetime Emmy Awards, the show got nine Emmy nominations.

Creative Arts Emmys

Primetime Emmy Awards

Golden Globe Awards
The Practice was nominated for "Best Television Series - Drama" at the Hollywood Foreign Press Association's Golden Globe Awards three straight years, winning in 1999. Camryn Manheim and Dylan McDermott both won a Golden Globe Award. The series only got nominations in 1999, 2000 and 2001. Manheim won her Golden Globe as a tie with Faye Dunaway for Gia.

NAACP Image Awards
A total of eleven NAACP Image Award nominations went to the show of which 6 for Steve Harris. The show was nominated for Outstanding Drama Series three times in a row, but never won. The only NAACP Image Award the show won was awarded to Steve Harris, in the category Outstanding Actor in a Drama Series. The show didn't get any nominations in 2003.

Viewers For Quality Television Q Awards
The Practice got a total of 16 nominations, and won 6, including: Best Quality Drama Series, Best Supporting Actor in a Quality Drama Series, Best Recurring Player, Best Actor in a Quality Drama Series and Best Supporting Actress in a Quality Drama Series. The series won the Best Quality Drama Series twice out of three nominations, other Q Awards went to Steve Harris, Camryn Manheim and John Larroquette.

Satellite Awards
The Satellite Awards, formerly known as the Golden Satellite Awards, are presented both for cinema and television. The Practice only won one award, which went to Camryn Manheim in 2000.

Other awards

David E. Kelley, Robert Breech, Jeffrey Kramer, Christina Musrey, Gary M. Strangis & Pamela J. Wisne

Michael Badalucco, Lara Flynn Boyle, Lisa Gay Hamilton, Steve Harris, Camryn Manheim, Dylan McDermott, Marla Sokoloff & Kelli Williams

Michael Badalucco, Lara Flynn Boyle, Lisa Gay Hamilton, Steve Harris, Jason Kravits, Camryn Manheim,  Dylan McDermott,  Marla Sokoloff &  Kelli Williams

References

External links
 Full List of Wins at The Internet Movie Database

Practice, The
Awards